Wang Dai Chen is a paralympic athlete from China competing mainly in category F46 javelin events.

He competed in the javelin at both the 2000 and 2004 Summer Paralympics winning a silver in 2000 and a bronze in 2004. He was also a member of the unsuccessful Chinese T46 relay in the 2000 games.

References

External links
 

Year of birth missing (living people)
Living people
Chinese male sprinters
Chinese male javelin throwers
Paralympic athletes of China
Paralympic silver medalists for China
Paralympic bronze medalists for China
Paralympic medalists in athletics (track and field)
Athletes (track and field) at the 2000 Summer Paralympics
Athletes (track and field) at the 2004 Summer Paralympics
Medalists at the 2000 Summer Paralympics
Medalists at the 2004 Summer Paralympics
Sprinters with limb difference
Javelin throwers with limb difference
Paralympic sprinters
Paralympic javelin throwers
21st-century Chinese people